Robert Joseph Morrissey  (born November 18, 1954) is a Canadian politician. He represents the electoral district of Egmont in the House of Commons of Canada. He is a member of the Liberal Party.

Morrissey previously represented the electoral districts of 1st Prince from 1982 to 1996 and Tignish-DeBlois from 1996 to 2000 in the Legislative Assembly of Prince Edward Island. He was a member of the Liberal Party.

Political career

Provincial politics
Morrissey, a Liberal, was first elected to the Legislative Assembly in the 1982 general election for 1st Prince. He was re-elected in the 1986, 1989, and 1993 elections. He was re-elected in the 1996 election in the new electoral district of Tignish-Deblois.

On May 2, 1986, Morrissey was appointed to the Executive Council of Prince Edward Island as Minister of Transportation and Public Works. He became Minister of Industry and Minister Responsible for the Prince Edward Island Development Agency in 1989 and was also named Minister Responsible for the redevelopment of CFB Summerside and the community following the base closure by the federal government. On April 15, 1993, Morrissey was named Minister of Economic Development and Tourism and Minister Responsible for Enterprise PEI. Following the 1996 general election, he held the positions of Opposition House Leader and Opposition critic for finance. While a Member, Morrissey served on the Standing Committee on Privileges, Rules and Private Bills, and the Standing Committee on Community Affairs and Economic Development. He was the chair of the Standing Committee on Public Accounts. Morrissey did not reoffer for the 2000 general election.

Federal politics
In November 2007, Morrissey was nominated as the Liberal candidate in Egmont for the 2008 Canadian federal election, following the retirement of Liberal MP Joe McGuire. However, he withdrew his candidacy on August 5, 2008, choosing instead to return to the private sector.

On November 22, 2014, Morrissey was nominated as the Liberal candidate in Egmont, for the 2015 federal election. On October 19, 2015, Morrissey won the election, defeating Conservative incumbent Gail Shea and New Democrat candidate Herb Dickieson.

Private career
Prior to entering politics in 1982, Morrissey was employed in the fishery. Since 2000, he was a consultant specializing in corporate/government relations, fisheries, labor market, and community development. He was also President of PFI Group, President of Global Food Technologies, and Director of Royal Star Investments.

Community involvement
Morrissey served as a trustee of the Unit 1 School Board and was Chair of West Prince Community Advisory Board. He was also vice-chair of the Parish Council of St. Simon and St. Jude, and an organizer of the Tignish Irish Moss Festival prior to his election in 1982.  Since 2000, he has served as a board member of the Heart & Stroke Foundation of PEI, was a founding member, President and treasurer of the Tignish Seniors Home Care Co-op, a member of the building and fundraising committees of the Credit Union Arena located in Tignish, and is Vice Chair of Tignish Special Needs Housing. Member of the Advisory Board to Holland College West Prince Campus.

Personal life
Morrissey was born at the Western Hospital in Alberton, Prince Edward Island, the son of Bernard and Marie (née O'Connor) Morrissey, who lived in Seacow Pond near Tignish, Prince Edward Island. He is a Catholic. He currently resides in Seacow Pond.

Electoral record

Federal

Provincial

References

External links

1954 births
Living people
People from Alberton, Prince Edward Island
People from Tignish, Prince Edward Island
Prince Edward Island Liberal Party MLAs
Liberal Party of Canada MPs
Members of the House of Commons of Canada from Prince Edward Island
Canadian fishers
Canadian Roman Catholics
Members of the Executive Council of Prince Edward Island
21st-century Canadian politicians
School board members in Canada